Oxford is a city in Newton County, Georgia, United States. As of the 2010 census, the city population was 2,134. It is the location of Oxford College of Emory University.

Much of the city is part of the National Parks-designated Oxford Historic District.

History
Oxford was established as a town by the Methodist Episcopal Church in 1839 as the birthplace of Oxford College of Emory University and incorporated as a city in 1914.

The town was named after Oxford University, the alma mater of the founders of Oxford College. The entire town is also designated as a shrine of the United Methodist Church. Additionally, Confederate soldiers are buried in a small cemetery on the grounds of Oxford College.

Properties in Oxford listed on the National Register of Historic Places include: Oxford Historic District and the Orna Villa, a mansion, which was built in 1825, which was used as a hospital during the American Civil War.

The Dukes of Hazzard filmed a car-jump scene on the grounds of the college, and other scenes around the town.

Geography

Oxford is located at  (33.624210, -83.869885).

Demographics

2020 census

As of the 2020 United States census, there were 2,308 people, 682 households, and 438 families residing in the city.

2000 census
As of the census of 2000, there were 1,892 people, 509 households, and 387 families residing in the city. The racial makeup of the city was 60.62% White, 32.72% African American, 0.42% Native American, 4.07% Asian, 0.05% Pacific Islander, 0.95% from other races, and 1.16% from two or more races. Hispanic or Latino of any race were 1.85% of the population.

There were 509 households, out of which 29.9% had children under the age of 18 living with them, 53.0% were married couples living together, 18.1% had a female householder with no husband present, and 23.8% were non-families. Of all households 20.8% were made up of individuals, and 8.3% had someone living alone who was 65 years of age or older. The average household size was 2.65 and the average family size was 3.00.

In the city, the population was spread out, with 17.9% under the age of 18, 34.4% from 18 to 24, 21.6% from 25 to 44, 18.0% from 45 to 64, and 8.2% who were 65 years of age or older. The median age was 22 years. For every 100 females, there were 78.0 males. For every 100 females age 18 and over, there were 73.1 males.

The median income for a household in the city was $38,698, and the median income for a family was $43,571. Males had a median income of $31,875 versus $25,556 for females. The per capita income for the city was $14,206. About 8.8% of families and 10.7% of the population were below the poverty line, including 15.0% of those under age 18 and 2.7% of those age 65 or over.

Education
Oxford College of Emory University
Providence Classical Christian School
R.L. Cousins Middle School
Palmer Stone Elementary School

Notable people
Heck Thomas, frontier lawman
Cora Mae Bryant, blues musician

References

Cities in Georgia (U.S. state)
Cities in Newton County, Georgia
1839 establishments in Georgia (U.S. state)